Sir John Bryan Munro Fuller (22 September 1917 – 31 January 2009) was an Australian politician, a member of the New South Wales Legislative Council for the Country Party from 1961 to 1978.

Early years
Fuller was born in the Sydney suburb of Mosman in 1917, and was educated at Knox Grammar School at Wahroonga. Following his schooling, he worked in rural New South Wales and Queensland, before acquiring and settling on a farm property at Coolah. A member of the NSW Country Party since 1940, he served as a councillor on the Coolah Shire Council from 1955 to 1965.

Political career
He was elected to the New South Wales Legislative Council on 23 April 1961. During his term he served as Minister for Decentralisation and Development (1965–1973), Deputy Leader of the Government in the Legislative Council (1966–1968), Minister for Planning and Environment (1973–1976), Vice-President of the Executive Council and Leader of the Government in the Legislative Council (1968–1976) and Leader of the Opposition in the Legislative Council (1976–1978).

After retiring from politics, Fuller remained actively involved in charities and organisations such as the Australian Monarchist League. He died on 31 January 2009, aged 91, after a long battle with cancer.

Honours
Fuller was made a Knight Bachelor on 1 January 1974 for his work as NSW Minister for Development. He was also awarded the Queen Elizabeth II Silver Jubilee Medal in 1977.

References

 

1917 births
2009 deaths
Australian Knights Bachelor
Australian politicians awarded knighthoods
Australian philanthropists
Deaths from cancer in New South Wales
Australian monarchists
Members of the New South Wales Legislative Council
National Party of Australia members of the Parliament of New South Wales
People educated at Knox Grammar School
20th-century Australian politicians
20th-century philanthropists